Snowed In is a 1926 American silent drama film serial in 10 episodes/chapters. Directed by Spencer Gordon Bennet, the film stars Allene Ray and Walter Miller. Aviation film historian James H. Farmer considered Snowed In as an "above average  serial of the period."

Plot

David Sheridan (Walter Miller), a forest ranger who teams up with Shirley Kane (Allene Ray), an adventuress to go up against a gang of bandits. The gang is controlled by the mysterious Charles Redfield, whom none of the bandits have ever actually seen.

A number of airmail robberies has taken place, and J.B. Swinnerton (Frank Austin), an airmail pilot is being blamed. Forest ranger Sheridan  is out to prove who is really behind the series of spectacular armed robberies.

When all the protagonists are cut off from the outside world by a blizzard, the immense forces of nature force everyone to find a way to survive.

Chapter titles
Storm Warnings
The Storm Starts
The Coming of Redfield
Redfield Strikes
Buried
The Enemy's Stronghold
The Trap
Thieves' Honor
Daybreak
The End of Redfield

Cast

 Allene Ray as Shirley Kane
 Walter Miller as David Sheridan
 Frank Austin as J.B. Swinnerton
 Tom London as U.S. Marshal Thayer (credited as Leonard Clapham)
 Harry Martell as Dr. Byrd (credited as Harrison Martell)
 Charles West as Harron
 J.F. McCullough as Howard Kane
 Wally Oettel
 John Webb Dillion
 Natalie Warfield
 Ben Walker
 Bert Appling
 George Magrill
 Albert Kingsley

Production
Filming for Snowed In took place in and around McCall, Idaho, in the Payette National Forest. Aircraft were staged out of McCall Municipal Airport in Valley County, Idaho.

Reception
Aviation film historian Michael Paris in From the Wright Brothers to Top Gun: Aviation, Nationalism, and Popular Cinema compared Snowed In to other films that dealt with the airmail pilots who operated in Western United States. He listed The Air Mail (1925) and Flying High (1926),The Flying Mail (1926), Wolves of the Air (1927), and Pirates of the Sky (1927) that were also examples of the sub-genre of the "modern western adventure" that often had heroes mounted on aircraft, not horses.

Preservation status
Snowed In is now considered to be a lost film.

See also
 List of film serials
 List of film serials by studio

References

Notes

Citations

Bibliography

 Farmer, James H. Celluloid Wings: The Impact of Movies on Aviation. Blue Ridge Summit, Pennsylvania: Tab Books Inc., 1984. .
 Paris, Michael. From the Wright Brothers to Top Gun: Aviation, Nationalism, and Popular Cinema. Manchester, UK: Manchester University Press, 1995. .
 Rowan, Terry. The American Western: A Complete Film Guide. Morrisville, North Carolina: LuLu.com, 2015. .

External links

 
 

1926 films
American aviation films
American silent serial films
American black-and-white films
1926 drama films
Lost American films
Pathé Exchange film serials
Films directed by Spencer Gordon Bennet
Silent American drama films
1926 lost films
Lost drama films
1920s American films